The 2009–10 The Citadel Bulldogs basketball team represented The Citadel, The Military College of South Carolina in the 2009-10 NCAA Division I men's basketball season. The Bulldogs were led by fourth year head coach Ed Conroy and played their home games at McAlister Field House. They played as members of the Southern Conference, as they have since 1936.

Schedule

|-
! colspan=8 style=""|

References

The Citadel Bulldogs basketball seasons
Citadel
Cite
Cite